The Passengers of the Night is a 2022 French drama film directed by Mikhaël Hers. Set on the night of the 1981 French presidential election and in the following days, the film follows a newly divorced mother of two teenagers who meets a troubled teenager. It premiered in competition at the Berlin International Film Festival on 13 February 2022.

Cast
 Charlotte Gainsbourg as Élisabeth
 Quito Rayon-Richter as Matthias
 Noée Abita as Talulah
 Megan Northam as Judith
 Thibault Vinçon as Hugo
 Emmanuelle Béart as Vanda Dorval
 Laurent Poitrenaux as Manuel Agostini
 Didier Sandre as Jean
 Lilith Grasmug as Leïla
 Calixte Broisin-Doutaz as Carlos
 Éric Feldman as Domi
 Ophélia Kolb as Marie-Paule
 Raphaël Thiéry as Francis
 Zoé Bruneau as The Teacher

Reception
On review aggregator website Rotten Tomatoes, the film holds an approval rating of 91%, based on eleven reviews, and an average rating of 7.50/10. On Metacritic, the film has a weighted average score of 72 out of 100, based on seven critics, indicating "generally favorable reviews".

References

External links
 

2022 films
2022 drama films
2020s French films
2020s French-language films
Films directed by Mikhaël Hers
Films scored by Anton Sanko
Films set in 1981
French drama films